Le Bas is a surname, and may refer to:

Charles Webb Le Bas (1779–1861), English clergyman 
Damian Le Bas (born 1963), British artist
Damian Le Bas (writer) (born 1963), British writer and journalist
Delaine Le Bas (born 1965), British artist
Edward Le Bas (1904–1966), British artist and collector
Hedley Le Bas (1868–1962), British publisher
Jacques-Philippe Le Bas (1707–1783), French engraver
Jessica Le Bas, New Zealand poet
Molly Le Bas (1903–1996), British sculptor
Philippe Le Bas (1794–1860), French hellenist
Philippe-François-Joseph Le Bas (1762–1794), French revolutionary